Spintharidius is a genus of orb-weaver spiders first described by Eugène Simon in 1893.  it contains only two species found in South America and the Caribbean.

References

Araneidae
Araneomorphae genera
Spiders of South America
Spiders of the Caribbean
Taxa named by Eugène Simon